Kinn Hamilton McIntosh  (born 20 June 1930), known professionally as Catherine Aird, is an English novelist. She is the author of more than twenty crime fiction novels and several collections of short stories. Her witty, literate, and deftly plotted novels straddle the "cozy" and "police procedural" genres and are somewhat similar in flavour to those of Martha Grimes, Caroline Graham, M C Beaton, Margaret Yorke, and Pauline Bell. She is a recipient of the 2015 Cartier Diamond Dagger award.

Biography 
Aird was born in Huddersfield, Yorkshire in England. She attended the Waverley School and Greenhead High School, both in Huddersfield. She has lived since the war in a village in East Kent, where for many years she took an active interest in local affairs as well as acting as a dispenser. As a young adult, she was bedridden due to a serious illness. Upon recovery, she worked as practice manager and dispenser for her father's medical practice in Sturry, near Canterbury, Kent. Her first novel, The Religious Body, was published in 1966.

Aird served as Chair of the Crime Writers' Association from 1990 through 1991. She has been awarded the CWA Golden Handcuffs award for lifetime achievement and the Diamond Dagger for an outstanding lifetime's contribution to the genre, in 2015.

In 1988, she was made a Member of the Order of the British Empire for services to the Girl Guides Association. She has been awarded an honorary MA from the University of Kent. She lives in the village of Sturry, Kent and is active in village life.

Aird is best known for her successful Chronicles of Calleshire, a series of crime novels set in the fictional County of Calleshire, England, and featuring Detective Inspector C.D. Sloan of the Berebury CID, and his assistant, Detective Constable Crosby. She has also written and edited a series of village histories, and is an editor and contributing author on works regarding other writers and the art of writing.

Bibliography

Novels
 The Religious Body (1966)
 A Most Contagious Game (1967)
 Henrietta Who (1968)
 The Complete Steel (1969) [The Stately Home Murder]
 A Late Phoenix (1970)
 His Burial Too (1973)
 Slight Mourning (1975)
 Parting Breath (1977)
 Some Die Eloquent (1979)
 Passing Strange (1980)
 Last Respects (1982)
 Harm's Way (1984)
 A Dead Liberty (1986)
 The Body Politic (1990)
 A Going Concern (1993)
 After Effects (1996)
 Stiff News (1998)
 Little Knell (2001)
 Amendment of Life (2002)
 A Hole in One (2005)
 Losing Ground (2007)
 Past Tense (2010)
 Dead Heading (2014)
 Learning Curve (2016)
 Inheritance Tracks (2019)

Collections
 The Catherine Aird Collection (1993)
 The Second Catherine Aird Collection (1994)
 The Third Catherine Aird Collection (1997)
 Injury Time (short stories, 1994)
 Chapter and Hearse (short stories, 2003)
 Last Writes (short stories, 2014)

Short stories
 "Grave Import" (1996)
 "Like To Die" (1997)
 "Handsel Monday" in Past Poisons (1998)
 "The Man Who Rowed for the Shore" (1998)
 "Gold Frankincense and Murder" (2000)
 "Cold Comfort" (2001)

Non-fiction
 The Oxford Companion to Crime and Mystery Writing (1999)
 Mystery Voices: Interviews with British Crime Writers (1991)

References

External links
 Official website

English crime fiction writers
Living people
People from Huddersfield
Members of the Order of the British Empire
English women novelists
20th-century English novelists
21st-century English novelists
20th-century English women writers
21st-century English women writers
Women mystery writers
Pseudonymous women writers
Writers from Yorkshire
1930 births
People from Sturry
20th-century pseudonymous writers
21st-century pseudonymous writers
Cartier Diamond Dagger winners
Members of the Detection Club